The following people were born or based their life in Vellore.

Education 
V. L. Ethiraj, Founder, Ethiraj College for Women
 G. Viswanathan, Founder and chancellor, VIT University
 V. M. Muralidharan, Chairman, Ethiraj College for Women
 Benjamin Pulimood, was the Director/Principal, Christian Medical College & Hospital

Entrepreneurs 
 Mecca Rafeeque Ahmed, Founder and managing director of FARIDA Group

Films and Entertainments  
 Viswanathan Ravichandran, also known as (Aascar V. Ravichandran) is an Indian film producer and distributor
 Aravinnd Singh, Cinematographer of Tamil films Demonte Colony and Diary
 Dinesh Ravi, Tamil actor of Attakathi and Visaaranai fame
 Vishnu Vishal, Tamil actor
 Bhaskar, Director of Bommarilu, Paragu, Orange, Ongole Githa, Bangalore Naatkal
 Aryan (actor), Indian film actor
 R. Nataraja Mudaliar, known as the father of Tamil cinema, was a pioneer in the production of silent films
 Vellore A. R. Srinivasan, classical Carnatic musician
 Vani Jairam, playback singer
 N. Viswanathan, Bengali Actor
Thiru, Tamil film director
 Radhika Apte, Bollywood Actress
 Indhuja Ravichandran, Tamil film Actress

Politics 
 V. S. Vijay, Indian politician and incumbent member of the Tamil Nadu legislative assembly from Vellore constituency and Ex-Minister for Health, Govt. of Tamil Nadu
 Abdul Rahman, Indian politician and former member of the Parliament of India from Vellore Constituency
 C. Abdul Hakim, Indian politician and businessman
 C. Gnanasekaran, Indian politician and former Member of the Legislative Assembly of Tamil Nadu
 Durai Murugan, Indian politician and Ex-Minister for Public Works, Govt. of Tamil Nadu

Sports 
 M Tamil Selvan, won silver medal in 1978 & 1982 Commonwealth Games.
 Sathish Sivalingam, Won gold medal in 77 kg category in 2014 & 2018 Commonwealth Games.
 Palani Amarnath, former Player of IPL chennai Superkings and Tamil Nadu Ranji Trophy.

Scientists 
 C. Mohan, Well known computer scientist in Silicon Valley, an IBM Fellow and the former IBM India Chief Scientist.

Writers
 Azhagiya Periyavan (pen name of C.Aravindan), journalist and author

Vellore